The following is a list of web service protocols.

BEEP - Blocks Extensible Exchange Protocol
CTS - Canonical Text Services Protocol
E-Business XML
Hessian
Internet Open Trading Protocol
JSON-RPC
JSON-WSP
SOAP - outgrowth of XML-RPC, originally an acronym for Simple Object Access Protocol
Universal Description, Discovery, and Integration (UDDI)
Web Processing Service (WPS)
WSCL - Web Services Conversation Language
WSFL - Web Services Flow Language (superseded by BPEL)
XINS Standard Calling Convention - HTTP parameters in (GET/POST/HEAD), POX out
XLANG - XLANG-Specification (superseded by BPEL)
XML-RPC - XML Remote Procedure Call

See also

List of web service frameworks
List of web service specifications
Service-oriented architecture
Web service

Application layer protocols
web service